Live from Nowhere, Volume 3 is a live album by Over the Rhine, released in 2008, containing highlights from the band's 2007 shows. The CD is a limited edition and comes in a fold-out digipak.

Track listing

Motherless Child
Angel Band
Hush Now
Trouble
Nothing is Innocent
I'm on a Roll
Don't Wait for Tom
Drunkard's Prayer
Who'm I Kiddin' But Me
Northpole Man
Snow Angels
Latter Days

Over the Rhine (band) albums
2008 live albums